Brian Statham (born 21 May 1969) is an English retired professional footballer who made over 160 appearances in the Football League for Brentford as a right back. He also played league football for Tottenham Hotspur, Gillingham, Reading, Bournemouth and was capped by England at U21 level.

Club career

Tottenham Hotspur 
A right back, Statham began his career in the youth system at First Division club Tottenham Hotspur and turned professional in 1987. He broke through into the first team during the 1987–88 season and made 19 appearances. Statham managed eight further appearances during the 1988–89 season, before dropping out of the squad. He spent time away on loan during the 1990–91 and 1991–92 seasons and departed White Hart Lane in February 1992. Statham was awarded a benefit match by the club in July 2000.

Brentford (loan and permanent transfer) 
In January 1992, Statham joined high-flying Third Division club Brentford on a one-month loan, with a view to a permanent transfer. He made just one appearance during his spell and rejected the contract offered, before reconsidering and joining the club on a permanent deal for a £70,000 fee on 28 February. Statham was a regular in the team during the last three months of the 1991–92 season, making 18 appearances and he won the first silverware of his career when Brentford secured the Third Division title on the final day. Statham's 58 appearances during the 1992–93 season in the reclassified First Division was a career-high, but the season ended on a disappointing note, with relegation straight back to the third-tier.

Back in the Second Division for the 1993–94 season, Statham made 36 appearances and scored what would be the only goal of his professional career in a 3–3 draw with Cambridge United on 26 March 1993. Despite appearing regularly during the first half of the 1994–95 season, he was transfer listed in December 1994. Statham made 44 appearances during a season in which the Bees were denied promotion after defeat to Huddersfield Town in the playoff semi-finals. During the 1995 off-season, Statham rejected a new contract in favour of a week-to-week deal. He made 24 appearances before suffering a double fracture of his right leg during a 1–0 FA Cup second round victory over Bournemouth on 2 December 1995. Though he was still on the weekly contract, the club would honour the terms of its initial contract offer until the end of the 1995–96 season.

Statham returned to training November 1996 and made his first appearance in nearly 13 months as a 79th-minute substitute for Carl Asaba in a 4–1 victory over Plymouth Argyle on 26 December 1996. Featuring mostly as a substitute, Statham finished with the 1996–97 season with 25 appearances, but his Brentford career would end in ignominy, after he was sent off after being shown a second yellow card late in the 1997 Second Division playoff Final, which was lost 1–0 to Crewe Alexandra. Statham departed Brentford in August 1997, having made 201 appearances and scored one goal during five-and-a-half years at Griffin Park.

Gillingham 
On 22 August 1997, Statham joined Second Division club Gillingham for a £10,000 fee, with two further £10,000 fees to be paid based on appearances. He made just 24 appearances before departing Priestfield in October 1999.

Non-League spells 
After loan spells with Woking and Stevenage Borough while a Gillingham player, Statham dropped back into non-League football upon his release from Gillingham. Between 2000 and 2005 he played for Chesham United, Chelmsford City, Welling United, East Thurrock United, Erith & Belvedere and Heybridge Swifts.

International career 
Statham won three caps for the England U21 team in 1988.

Managerial career

Heybridge Swifts 
Statham was appointed as manager of Isthmian League Premier Division club Heybridge Swifts in January 2005. He guided the club to a runners-up finish in the 2005–06 season, but the Swifts were denied promotion after falling to Hampton & Richmond Borough in the playoff semi-finals. After two mid-table finishes, Statham resigned on 28 August 2008.

Billericay Town 
On 23 April 2009, Statham was announced as manager of Isthmian League Premier Division club Billericay Town. With relegation at the end of the 2009–10 season looking a possibility, Statham was sacked on 29 March 2010.

Personal life 
Statham was born in Harare, Rhodesia and later lived in Saudi Arabia, before his parents moved to Essex. The namesake of a former England international cricketer, he represented Essex in school cricket. Statham's son Maxwell is also a footballer and plays in non-League football. After retiring from football, Statham became a businessman, with interests in media, insurance and investments. He is also a football agent.

Career statistics

References

External links
Brian Statham at Soccerbase

1969 births
Living people
English footballers
England under-21 international footballers
Association football defenders
Tottenham Hotspur F.C. players
Reading F.C. players
AFC Bournemouth players
Brentford F.C. players
Gillingham F.C. players
Woking F.C. players
Stevenage F.C. players
Chesham United F.C. players
Chelmsford City F.C. players
Welling United F.C. players
East Thurrock United F.C. players
Erith & Belvedere F.C. players
English Football League players
English football managers
Heybridge Swifts F.C. managers
Billericay Town F.C. managers
Isthmian League players
National League (English football) players
Isthmian League managers
Heybridge Swifts F.C. players